Brodmann Area 14 is one of Brodmann's subdivisions of the cerebral cortex in the brain.  It was defined by Brodmann in the guenon monkey
.  While Brodmann, writing in 1909, argued that no equivalent structure existed in humans, later work demonstrated that area 14 has a clear homologue in the human ventromedial prefrontal cortex.

Anatomy

Brodmann areas were defined based on cytoarchitecture rather than function.  Area 14 differs most clearly from Brodmann area 13-1905 in that it lacks a distinct internal granular layer (IV). Other differences are a less distinct external granular layer (II), a widening of the relatively cell-free zone of the external pyramidal layer (III); cells in the internal pyramidal layer (V) are denser and rounded; and the cells of the multiform layer (VI) assume a more distinct tangential orientation.

Function
According to one theory, Area 14 is believed to serve as association cortex for the visceral senses and olfaction along with Area 51.  Its anatomical inputs also suggest that it helps to aggregate autonomic information.

See also
 Brodmann area
 List of regions in the human brain

References

External links

 For internal structures and additional information on area 14 see BrainInfo

14